Psomophis is a genus of snakes in the family Colubridae. The genus is endemic to South America.

Species
The genus Psomophis contains three species which are recognized as being valid.
Psomophis genimaculatus 
Psomophis joberti 
Psomophis obtusus 

Nota bene: A binomial authority in parentheses indicates that the species was originally described in a genus other than Psomophis.

References

Further reading
Myers, Charles W.; Cadle, John E. (1994). "A New Genus for South American Snakes Related to Rhadinaea obtusa Cope (Colubridae) and Resurrection of Taeniophallus Cope for the “Rhadinaea” brevirostris Group". American Museum Novitates (3102): 1-33. (Psomophis, new genus, p. 6).

Psomophis
Snake genera